AIR is a name under which Kōji Kurumatani (車谷浩司) released his songs from 1996 to 2009, succeeded by Laika Came Back. He started AIR two months after SPIRAL LIFE broke up in April 1996. His work is noted for lyrics that take on social issues and politics, and can be classified as alternative rock.

Discography

Singles

Albums
Wear Off (11 November 1996)
My Life as Air (29 October 1997)
Spawn (25 February 1998)
Usual Tone of Voice (23 September 1998)
Freedom/99 (9 September 1999)
My Live as Air (28 June 2000)- Live Album
Stilly (2 March 2001)
Flying Colors (14 March 2001)
My Way (17 October 2002)
On My Way (26 March 2003) - Remix Album
Best Not Best (25 June 2003)
One (27 November 2003)
Singles (20 October 2004) - Single Collection
A Day in the Life (23 November 2005)
The Bread of Life (1 December 2005)- Live Album
The New Day Rising (21 February 2007)
Live and Learn (21 February 2007) - Live Album
Nayuta (27 February 2008)
Three Cheers for Goodbye~The Best of Air (11 February 2009)

DVD
Flying Colors (27 October 2001)
One {2004.1.10 yokohama arena} (14 April 2004)
Air of Tokyo (25 August 2004)
Neo Kamikaze Sat 29th April 2000 Air in N.K (30 March 2005)

References

See also
Japanese popular music

 

Japanese male rock singers
Living people
Year of birth missing (living people)